There have been about 600 mayors in Lancaster, Lancashire since 1338.

Mayors from 1338 to 1937

 1338 Robert de Bolron		
 1341 John le Keu	
 1342 Robert de Bolron	
 1345 Robert de Bolron	
 1346 Robert de Bolron	
 1347 Robert de Bolron	
 1349 Robert de Bolron	
 1350 John de Catheron	
 1362/3 John de Skerton	
 1371 John de Skerton	
 1372 John de Skerton	
 1373 John de Catherton	
 1381 John de Catherton	
 1382 Edmund Frere	
 1386 John de Elslak	
 1391 John de Elslak	
 1403 John Stanlow	
 1407 Richard Elslak	
 1416 Richard Elslak	
 1425 Edmund Frere	
 1440 Edmund Hornby	
 1442 John Stodagh	
 1446 Edmund Hornby	
 1452 Thomas Curwen	
 1459 Robert Lawrence	
 1463 Robert Ramso	
 1465 William Skillicorne	
 1467 John Gardyner	
 1472 Robert Lee	
 1474/5 John Curwen	
 1478 Simon Tomlinson	
 1483  John Hobersty	
 1488 John Walton	
 1488 Richard Gardener	
 1488 Christopher Leming
 1489 Christopher Leming
 1495 Lawrence Starkie	
 1498 Richard Gardyner
 1500 Thomas Edmondson
 1500/1 Richard Nelson
 1504 Robert Hirdeman
 1508 Gilbert White
 1512 Richard Nelson
 1524 William Sclaiter
 1527 John Standish
 1542 John Standish
 1543 John Standish
 1552 Richard Gardyner
 1553 William Colteman	
 1560/1 John Huetson
 1562 William Coltman
 1563 Ranulf Gilpin
 1564 William Bateson
 1565 William Coltman
 1565 Nicholas Oliver
 1566 Nicholas Oliver
 1569 John Huetson
 1569 Nicholas Olivers
 1570 Nicholas Olivers
 1572 Nicholas Olivers
 1573 Robert Dalton
 1574 John Hewetson
 1575 Nicholas Olivers
 1577 James Brown
 1578/9 Richard Gilpin
 1580 Gawin Braitwat
 1581 James Brown
 1582 Gawin Braythwayte
 1595 Thomas Southworthe
 1598 James Browne
 1600 Nicholas Eccleston
 1601 James Browne
 1602 Nicholas Eccleston
 1606 Thomas Covell
 1607 Nicholas Eccleston
 1608 George Thompson
 1609 William Parkinson
 1628 Thomas Covelle
 1629 Galfridus Heysham
 1630 George Toulnson
 1631 Edmund Covelle
 1632 Richard Sands
 1633 William Shaw
 1638 Richard Sands
 1639 William Shaw
 1645 William Shaw
 1650 George Toulnson
 1652 Major Riparn
 1653 Thomas Riparn
 1654 Thomas Riparn
 1655 John Bateman
 1661 Henry Porter
 1663 Thomas Soothworth
 1664 Thomas Johnes
 1664 William Waller
 1665 Sir Robert Bindlosse
 1666 William Parkinson
 1667 Francis Hunter
 1668 William West
 1669 Thomas Soothworth
 1670 William Waller
 1671 John Greenwood
 1672/3 Sir Robert Bindloss & William Parkinson
 1674 Thomas Corless
 1675 Christopher Prockter
 1676 William Toulson
 1677 William Waller
 1678 John Greenwood
 1679 Francis Hunter
 1680 Francis Medcalfe & Christopher Prockter
 1681 Henry Johnes
 1682 Joshua Partington
 1683 Randal Hunter
 1684 John Hodgson
 1685 Robert Stirzaker
 1686 John Foster
 1687/8 Thomas Sherson & John Greenwood
 1688/9 John Hodgson & John Greenwood
 1689 John Foster
 1690 Thomas Baynes
 1691 Henry Johnes
 1692 Joshua Partington
 1693 John Hodgson	
 1694 William Penny	
 1695 Thomas Medcalfe	
 1696 George Foxcroft	
 1697 Thomas Waller	
 1698 Robert Parkinson	
 1699 Robert Carter	
 1700 Thomas Sherson	
 1701 John Hodgson	
 1702 William Penny	
 1703 Thomas Simpson	
 1704 Thomas Medcalf	
 1705 Thomas Waller	
 1706 Robert Parkinson	
 1707 Robert Carter	
 1708 Thomas Westmore	
 1709 Thomas Sherson	
 1710 Thomas Gardner	
 1711 William Penny	
 1712 Richard Simpson	
 1713 John Bryer	
 1714 Thomas Waller	
 1715 Robert Parkinson	
 1716 Edmund Cole
 1717 Robert Carter
 1718 Thomas Westmore
 1719 Richard Simpson
 1720 John Bryer
 1721 Thomas Waller
 1722 Christopher Butterfield
 1723 Thomas Croft
 1725 Edmund Cole
 1726 Robert Winder
 1727 Thomas Westmore
 1728 John Coward
 1729 Thomas Postlethwaite
 1730 John Casson
 1731 Christopher Butterfield
 1732 James Smethurst
 1733 James Tomlinson
 1734 John Bowes
 1735 William Bryer
 1736 Edmund Cole
 1737 Robert Winder
 1738 Thomas Postlethwaite
 1739 Thomas Smoult
 1740 John Gunson
 1741 John Casson
 1742 John Bowes
 1743 William Bryer
 1744 Robert Winder
 1745 Thomas Gibson
 1746 James Holmes
 1747 Henry Bracken
 1748 James Rigmaiden
 1749 Miles Barber
 1750 Thomas Postlethwaite
 1751 John Gunson
 1752 Joshua Bryer
 1753 Gwalter Borranskill
 1754 Robert Winder
 1755 John McMillan
 1756 William Butterfield
 1757 Henry Bracken
 1758 Miles Barber
 1759 Joshua Bryer
 1760 Robert Foxcroft
 1761 Gwalter Boranskill
 1762 Robert Winder
 1763 John Stout
 1764 Robert Walshman
 1765 Edward Suart
 1766 James Hinde
 1767 John Bowes
 1768 James Barrow
 1769 Thomas Hinde
 1770 William Butterfield
 1771 Robert Foxcroft
 1772 John Stout
 1773 Edward Suart
 1774 James Hinde
 1775 John Bowes
 1776 Henry Hargreaves
 1777 James Barrow
 1778 Thomas Hinde
 1779 William Butterfield
 1780 Robert Foxcroft
 1781 Edward Suart
 1782 James Hinde
 1783 James Bowes
 1784 Henry Hargreaves
 1785 Miles Mason
 1786 William Watson
 1787 John Housman
 1788 Samuel Simpson
 1789 John Watson
 1790 Anthony Atkinson
 1791 Edward Suart
 1792 James Hinde
 1793 John Tallon
 1794 Robert Addison
 1795 Richard Johnson
 1796 David Campbell
 1797 Thomas Harris
 1798 James Moore
 1799 Richard Postelthwaite
 1800 Richard Atkinson
 1801 James Parkinson
 1802 Thomas Shepherd
 1803 Robert Addison
 1804 Jackson Mason
 1805 Richard Johnson
 1806 Thomas Burrow
 1807 John Taylor Wilson
 1808 James Moore & Thomas Moore
 1809 Richard Atkinson
 1810 Thomas Moore
 1811 John Baldwin
 1812 Thomas Giles
 1813 Richard Johnson
 1814 John Park
 1815 Thomas Burrow
 1816 John Wilson
 1817 Samuel Gregson
 1818 Thomas Salisbury
 1819 John Bond
 1820 James Atkinson
 1821 Thomas Bowes
 1822 James Nottage
 1823 Thomas Giles
 1824 Leonard Redmayne
 1825 Samuel Gregson
 1826 John Wilson
 1827 Thomas Salisbury
 1828 George Burrow
 1829 John Bond
 1830 James Atkinson
 1831 Thomas Giles
 1832 Christopher Johnson
 1833 George Burrow
 1834 John Brockbank
 1835/36 George Burrow
 1836/37 Thomas Higgin
 1837/38 John Greg
 1838/39 John Armstrong
 1839/40 Joseph Dockray
 1840/41 William Robinson
 1841/42 Johnathan Dunn
 1842/43 Johnathan Dunn
 1843/44 Edward de Vitre
 1844/45 Edward Salisbury
 1845/46 James Giles
 1846/47 John Sharp
 1847/48 Thomas Howitt
 1848/49 Edmund Sharpe
 1849/50 Joseph Dockray
 1850/51 Henry Gregson
 1851/52 John Sherson
 1852/53 John Hall
 1853/54 John Burrell
 1854/55 John Brocklebank
 1855/56 Edward de Vitre
 1856/57 Richard Hinde
 1857/58 Christopher Johnson
 1858/59 William Jackson
 1859/60 William Whelan
 1860/61 John Greg
 1861/62 Henry Gregson
 1862/63 John Greg
 1863/64 George Jackson
 1864/65 James Williamson Snr
 1866/67 William Wane
 1867/68 Thomas Storey
 1868/69 Richard Coupland
 1869/70 William Roper
 1870/71 William Bradshaw
 1871/72 Charles Blades
 1872/73 William Storey
 1873/74 Thomas Storey
 1874/75 Thomas Storey
 1875/76 Thomas Preston
 1876/77 Henry Welch
 1877/78 Abram Welch
 1878/79 William Hall
 1879/80 George Cleminson
 1880/81 Edward Clark
 1881/82 Samuel Harris
 1882/83 Joseph Fenton
 1883/84 Samuel Harris
 1884/85 Edward Clark
 1885/86 James Hatch
 1886/87 Thomas Storey
 1887/88 Charles Blades
 1888/89 Charles Blades
 1889/90 Thomas Preston
 1890/91 Charles Blades
 1891/92 William Smith
 1892/93 John Kitchen
 1893/94 William Gilchrist
 1894/95 Robert Preston
 1895/96 William Huntington
 1896/97 Norval Helme
 1897/98 William Huntington
 1898/99 William Bell
 1899/1900 Robert Preston
 1900/01 Robert Preston
 1901/02 Richard Hall
 1902/03 George Jackson
 1903/04 John Allen
 1904/05 James Heald
 1905/06 Alexander Satterthwaite
 1906/07 William Hamilton
 1907/08 Robert Wilson
 1908/09 Robert Wilson
 1909/10 Robert Wilson
 1910/11 Robert Preston
 1911/12 Edward Cardwell
 1912/13 Charles Seward
 1913/14 William Briggs
 1914/15 William Briggs
 1915/16 William Briggs
 1916/17 William Briggs
 1917/18 William Briggs
 1918/19 William Briggs
 1919/20 George Wright
 1920/21 Thomas Wilkinson
 1921/22 John Robert Nuttall
 1922/23 James Oglethorpe
 1923/24 George Jackson
 1924/25 George Jackson
 1925/26 Robert Roberts
 1926/27 Isaac Curwen
 1927/28 Edward Parr
 1928/29 Edward Smith
 1929/30 Thomas Till
 1930/31 James Hodkinson
 1931/32 William Procter
 1932/33 Annie E. Helme
 1933/34 Henry Warbrick
 1934/35 William Simpson
 1935/36 James Clark
 1936/37 Robert Bamber

Mayors from 1937 to 1974.
The City of Lancaster gained City status on 12 May 1937, as part of the Coronation celebrations of King George VI
The Mayor was henceforth entitled to be addressed as "The Right Worshipful the Mayor" of the City of Lancaster.

 1936/37 Robert Bamber
 1937/38 Harry Dowthwaite
 1938/39 Hermione Musgrave-Hoyle
 1939/40 Vincent Cross
 1940/41 Muriel Dowbiggin
 1941/42 Joseph Waddington
 1942/43 Alex Robertson
 1943/44 Walter Grosse
 1944/45 Arthur Grosse
 1945/46 George Blatchford
 1946/47 James Dirkin
 1947/48 Herbert Butler
 1948/49 Herbert Butler
 1949/50 George Chirnside
 1950/51 George Chirnside
 1951/52 Harry Price
 1952/53 Charles Treu
 1953/54 Norman Gorrill
 1954/55 Bert Scott
 1955/56 Thomas Hully
 1956/57 Helen Daniel
 1957/58 Thomas Hayton
 1958/59 James Rogerson
 1959/60 Cecilia Pickard
 1960/61 Percival Oliver
 1961/62 Margery Lovett-Horn
 1962/63 Ernest Gardner
 1963/64 Chris Preston
 1964/65 Alfred Morris
 1965/66 Clara Burt
 1966/67 Eric Jones
 1967/68 Charles Denwood
 1968/69 Eric Simpson
 1969/70 Douglas Clift
 1970/71 Samuel Smith
 1971/72 Winifred Sweeney
 1972/73 Doris Henderson
 1973/74 Roland Jones

Post 1974
The former City and Municipal Borough of Lancaster and the Municipal Borough of Morecambe and Heysham along with other authorities merged in 1974 to form the City of Lancaster district within the shire county of Lancashire.

References

Lists of mayors of places in England